Qikiqtarjuaq (formerly known as Broughton Island until November 1998 ,) is a community located on Broughton Island in the Qikiqtaaluk Region of Nunavut, Canada. The island is known for Arctic wildlife (ringed seals, polar bears, bowhead whales, narwhals), bird watching at the Qaqulluit National Wildlife Area (qaqulluit is the Inuktitut word for northern fulmar). The community serves as the northern access point for Auyuittuq National Park and Pangnirtung is the southern access point.

Qikiqtarjuaq hosts an annual "Suicide Prevention Walk". Today the walk is much shorter than the original two and a half days, but it is still meant to promote hope among the community.

The community hosts a two-week celebration over the Christmas and New Year period every year. Visitors are warmly welcomed and encouraged to join the festivities and games.

Near Qikiqtarjuaq was the home of FOX-5, a Distant Early Warning Line and now a North Warning System site.

In July 2011, Qikiqtarjuaq was featured in the BBC Radio 4 comedy series Cabin Pressure.

Geography 
Qikiqtarjuaq is situated above the Arctic Circle and off eastern Baffin Island. Both Davis Strait and Baffin Bay run to the east, and the Baffin Mountains are located to the west, more specifically the Arctic Cordillera mountain range. It is also one of the Nunavut communities closest to Greenland.

Demographics 

Services
It is served by Qikiqtarjuaq Airport, . 

There are two grocery stores; the Co-Op and the Northern Store (with a Canada Post kiosk). There are no restaurants or banks. Various accommodations are available. A health centre and Royal Canadian Mounted Police (RCMP) detachment are present as well. The health centre is composed of two nurses, an X-ray technician, a community health coordinator, a mental health worker, and administrative staff.

The community has a hamlet building where municipal affairs are conducted with a large community hall and meeting room. There is one school for K-12 students called Inuksuit School, and attached to the building is a small campus for Nunavut Arctic College. The Piqalujaujaq Visitors Centre shares a building with the Auyuittuq National Park office. Access to Auyuittuq National Park north entrance is approximately two hours by boat in the summer months, two - two and a half hours by vehicle or snowmobile in winter months. All park visitors must register and book an orientation session prior to entry into the park, and non-Inuit who visit Auyuittuq must do so by hiring a local licensed operator.
 
Qikiqtarjuaq is a popular stop for pilots who fly smaller aircraft to and from Europe. The airport has a  gravel runway that is maintained. Qikiqtarjuaq is considerably closer to Kangerlussuaq, Greenland than Iqaluit (CYFB). The instrument approach minima for the non-directional beacon (NDB) approach at CYVM is relatively high (2,000 feet barometric, 1,982 AGL) due to high terrain surrounding the airport. An airport advisory service, Qikiqtarjuaq Airport Radio, a Community Airport Radio Station (CARS), provides assistance to pilots during normal business hours, and provides weather observation services. An automatic weather observation service (AWOS) operates when Qikiqtarjuaq Radio is unattended. 

There is also an access road that was built to Tisunaaq, also known as Ceetee Land to the Elders, and another road is in construction to Qikiqtarjuaqruluk, or Old Broughton, an abandoned settlement.

Broadband communications 
The community has been served by the Qiniq network since 2005. Qiniq is a fixed wireless service to homes and businesses, connecting to the outside world via a satellite backbone. The Qiniq network is designed and operated by SSi Canada. In 2017, the network was upgraded to 4G LTE technology, and 2G-GSM for mobile voice. In 2020, Bell Mobility established a data tower and provides high-speed mobile and internet connectivity within the community.

Climate
Qikiqtarjuaq has a tundra climate (ET), with the warmest month averaging below . Summers tend to be cool with chilly nights, while winters are long and cold. Early winter is the snowiest time of the year, with more than half of all year snowfall on average falling during this period.

Around Qikiqtarjuaq

See also
List of municipalities in Nunavut

References

Further reading

 Mallory ML, BM Braune, M Wayland, and KG Drouillard. 2005. "Persistent Organic Pollutants in Marine Birds, Arctic Hare and Ringed Seals Near Qikiqtarjuaq, Nunavut, Canada". Marine Pollution Bulletin. 50, no. 1: 95–101.
 Stuckenberger, Anja Nicole. Community at play social and religious dynamics in the modern Inuit community of Qikiqtarjuaq = Een Samenleving in het Spel : sociale en religieuze Dynamiek in de moderne Inuit Gemeenschap van Qikiqtarjuaq. Amsterdam: Rozenberg, 2005.

External links

 The Tulugak Hotel
 Qikiqtarjuaq Facts
 Leelie Enterprises (Airport Fuel Provider, FBO, and Lodge Operator)

Arctic Cordillera
Populated places in Arctic Canada
Hamlets in the Qikiqtaaluk Region
Road-inaccessible communities of Nunavut